GRB 060218 (and SN 2006aj) was a gamma-ray burst (abbreviated as GRB) with unusual characteristics never seen before.  This GRB was detected by the Swift satellite on February 18, 2006, and its name is derived from the date.  It was located in the constellation Aries.

GRB 060218's duration (almost 2000 seconds) and its origin in a galaxy 440 million light years away are far longer and closer, respectively, than typical gamma-ray bursts seen before, and the burst was also considerably dimmer than average despite its close distance.

As of February 2006, the phenomenon was not yet well understood.  However, an optical afterglow to the gamma-ray burst has been detected and is brightening, and some scientists believe that the appearance of a supernova (SN 2006aj) may be ongoing.

Four different groups of researchers, led by Sergio Campana, Elena Pian, Alicia Soderberg and Paolo Mazzali respectively, carried out the investigation of the phenomenon and presented their results in Nature on August 31, 2006. They found the strongest evidence yet that supernovae and GRBs might be linked, because GRB 060218 showed signs of both the GRB and the supernova. The exploding star is believed to have had the boundary mass (about 20 Solar masses) for supernovae to leave either a black hole or a neutron star after its explosion.

References

External links
 Light curves and spectra  on the Open Supernova Catalog

 http://www.spaceref.com/news/viewpr.html?pid=19106
 http://www.space.com/scienceastronomy/060223_explosion.html
 http://skyandtelescope.com/news/article_1683_1.asp
 http://www.newscientistspace.com/article/dn8776.html
 http://sabbe.fragzone.se/KPO/grb060218.htm
 YahooNews
 Finder Charts for GRB 060218  shows the area of the sky prior to the incident.
 More NASA observational reports at the Burst Information (Current and Archives)
 Simbad
 Image SN 2006aj

060218
Supernovae
Aries (constellation)
20060218
February 2006 events